Cadillac is a village in the Canadian province of Saskatchewan within the Rural Municipality of Wise Creek No. 77 and Census Division No. 4. It is at the intersection of Highway 13, the Red Coat Trail, and Highway 4 in the southwest portion of the province. Located 40 mi/62 km south of the City of Swift Current, The three largest buildings remaining in the community are the former Cadillac School, the Cadillac Skating and Curling Rink, and the former Saskatchewan Wheat Pool grain elevator.

History 
Cadillac incorporated as a village on July 2, 1914. It was named after Cadillac, Michigan, the starting point for many early French speaking settlers who began arriving about 1910.

Demographics 

Notable people 
Mark Lamb, former NHL player

See also 

 List of communities in Saskatchewan
 Villages of Saskatchewan

References

Villages in Saskatchewan
Wise Creek No. 77, Saskatchewan
Division No. 4, Saskatchewan